Nadia and the Hippos is a 1999 French drama film directed by Dominique Cabrera. It was screened in the Un Certain Regard section at the 1999 Cannes Film Festival.

Cast
 Ariane Ascaride - Nadia
 Marilyne Canto - Claire
 Thierry Frémont - Serge
 Philippe Fretun - Jean-Paul
 Najd Hamou-Medja - Christopher
 Olivier Gourmet - Andre
 Pierre Berriau - Gérard
 Laurent Arnal - Sébastien
 Michel Bony - Un cheminôt
 Sasha Nakache - Christopher bis I
 Ruben Nakache - Christopher bis II

References

External links

1999 films
French drama films
1990s French-language films
1999 drama films
Films directed by Dominique Cabrera
1990s French films